29th London Film Critics Circle Awards
4 February 2009

Film of the Year: 
 The Wrestler 

British Film of the Year: 
 Slumdog Millionaire 

The 29th London Film Critics Circle Awards, honouring the best in film for 2008, were announced by the London Film Critics Circle on 4 February 2009.

Winners and nominees

Film of the Year
The Wrestler
The Curious Case of Benjamin Button
Frost/Nixon
Milk
WALL-E

British Film of the Year
Slumdog Millionaire
Happy-Go-Lucky
Hunger
In Bruges
Man on Wire

Foreign Language Film of the Year
Waltz with Bashir • IsraelGomorrah • Italy
I've Loved You So Long • France
The Orphanage • Spain
Persepolis • France

Director of the YearDavid Fincher – The Curious Case of Benjamin Button
Darren Aronofsky – The Wrestler
Danny Boyle – Slumdog Millionaire
Clint Eastwood – Changeling
Gus Van Sant – Milk

British Director of the Year
Danny Boyle – Slumdog Millionaire
Terence Davies – Of Time and the City
Mike Leigh – Happy-Go-Lucky
Steve McQueen – Hunger
Christopher Nolan – The Dark Knight

Screenwriter of the Year
Simon Beaufoy – Slumdog Millionaire
Eric Roth – The Curious Case of Benjamin Button
Peter Morgan – Frost/Nixon
Martin McDonagh – In Bruges
David Hare – The Reader

Breakthrough British Filmmaker
Steve McQueen – Hunger
Joanna Hogg – Unrelated
Martin McDonagh – In Bruges
James Watkins – Eden Lake
Rupert Wyatt – The Escapist

Actor of the Year
Mickey Rourke – The Wrestler
Josh Brolin – W.
Frank Langella – Frost/Nixon
Heath Ledger – The Dark Knight
Sean Penn – Milk

Actress of the Year
Kate Winslet – The Reader and Revolutionary Road
Penélope Cruz – Vicky Cristina Barcelona
Anne Hathaway – Rachel Getting Married
Angelina Jolie – Changeling
Meryl Streep – Doubt

British Actor of the Year
Michael Fassbender – Hunger 
Ralph Fiennes – The Duchess
Ben Kingsley – Elegy
Dev Patel – Slumdog Millionaire
Michael Sheen – Frost/Nixon

British Actress of the Year
Kristin Scott Thomas – I've Loved You So Long 
Rebecca Hall – Vicky Cristina Barcelona
Sally Hawkins – Happy-Go-Lucky
Tilda Swinton – Julia
Kate Winslet – The Reader and Revolutionary Road

British Supporting Actor of the Year
Eddie Marsan – Happy-Go-Lucky 
Liam Cunningham – Hunger
Toby Jones – Frost/Nixon and W.
Peter O'Toole – Dean Spanley
Mark Strong – Body of Lies

British Supporting Actress of the Year
Tilda Swinton – The Curious Case of Benjamin Button 
Hayley Atwell – The Duchess
Kristin Scott Thomas – Easy Virtue
Emma Thompson – Brideshead Revisited
Alexis Zegerman – Happy-Go-Lucky

Young British Performer of the Year
Thomas Turgoose – Somers Town and Eden Lake
Asa Butterfield – The Boy in the Striped Pyjamas
Georgia Groome – Angus, Thongs and Perfect Snogging
Bill Milner – Son of Rambow
Dev Patel – Slumdog Millionaire
Will Poulter – Son of Rambow

Dilys Powell Award
Judi Dench

References

2
2008 film awards
2008 in London
2008 in British cinema